Rima Baškienė (born 25 October 1960) is a Lithuanian politician, a Member of the Seimas since 2004 and, since November 2016, First Deputy Speaker of the Seimas. Also she is a former Vice Mayor of Šiauliai District. Baškienė also was the Vice Chairwoman of the Lithuanian Farmers and Greens Union.

In 2021, Baškienė left that party and in the beginning of 2022 she has joined the newly formed Union of Democrats "For Lithuania", founded by former prime minister Saulius Skvernelis, the former leader of election list of the Lithuanian Farmers and Greens Union.

References

1960 births
Living people
Lithuanian Farmers and Greens Union politicians
Women members of the Seimas
Lithuanian municipal councillors
Politicians from Šiauliai
21st-century Lithuanian politicians
Vice-mayors of places in Lithuania
21st-century Lithuanian women politicians
Members of the Seimas